D.E.B.S. is a 2004 American action-comedy film written and directed by Angela Robinson. A feature-length version of Robinson's 2003 short film of the same name, D.E.B.S. follows the relationship between spy-in-training Amy Bradshaw and supervillain Lucy Diamond. D.E.B.S. was a critically mixed box office bomb upon its initial release but went on to become a cult film in the following years.

Plot 
Embedded in the SAT is a secret test that determines aptitude for espionage. Women who score highly on the test are recruited into D.E.B.S. (Discipline, Energy, Beauty, Strength), a clandestine paramilitary academy. Four D.E.B.S.—squad leader Max, naïve Janet, promiscuous Dominique, and Amy, who dreams of attending art school despite being the academy's top recruit—are tasked by Ms. Petrie and Mr. Phipps, the heads of D.E.B.S., to surveil Lucy Diamond. Diamond is an infamous supercriminal, known for her operations, thefts, an alleged attempt to sink Australia, as well as supposedly killing every agent that goes up against her. Amy in particular is interested in Lucy due to writing a senior thesis about her. It is believed that Lucy is meeting Russian assassin Ninotchka Kaprova. Unbeknownst to them, Lucy is a rather neurotic woman, who has trouble opening up to people. Her meeting with Ninotchka is, in fact, a blind date.

In the meantime, Amy has recently broken up with her pushy and controlling boyfriend, Bobby, a fellow agent. The D.E.B.S. observe Lucy's date with Ninotchka, and are interrupted by Bobby, who is on his own stakeout, with several intelligence agencies also observing Lucy. Lucy has trouble connecting with Ninotchka, and tries to call off the date. Amy gets into an argument with Bobby, demanding answers on their breakup, which catches Lucy's attention. A shootout ensues, and Lucy flees while being chased by the D.E.B.S. Lucy is caught in a standoff with Amy, but they end up having a friendly conversation. Lucy escapes when Amy's attention wavers, and the D.E.B.S. praise Amy for being the only person to have ever faced Lucy and lived.

Lucy quickly takes a liking to Amy, and against the advice of her friend and henchman, Scud, sneaks into Amy's dorm. Lucy initially says she wants to help Amy on her thesis, but ends up coercing her into joining her at a nightclub, along with Janet, who witnesses Lucy speaking with Amy. During this trip, Lucy and Amy grow closer and have a conversation about their lives and relationships. Lucy even clarifies that the deaths of the agents sent after her were happenstance. Janet and Scud also befriend each other. When the two open up to each other, Lucy and Amy are about to kiss, but are interrupted by Janet.

Later, Amy is promoted to squad leader, replacing Max, much to Max's jealousy. Ms. Petrie plans on using Amy's encounter with Lucy to boost the D.E.B.S. image and reputation. Amy is hesitant to talk about her encounter due to her growing feelings for Lucy. The D.E.B.S. respond to a bank heist orchestrated by Lucy, which she has committed in order to see Amy again. When Lucy and Amy are alone, the two kiss, and Lucy talks Amy into running off with her. The D.E.B.S. assume Amy has been kidnapped and organize a nationwide manhunt to find her. In the meantime, Lucy and Amy enjoy having an actual relationship with one another, while Janet covers for them (and also develops feelings for Scud, whom she has a secret correspondence with).

On the basis of a tip from a jealous Ninotchka, the D.E.B.S. and Bobby discover Amy and Lucy while they are having sex. When Amy returns to the academy, Ms. Petrie prepares to exile Amy, but Max convinces her to claim that Amy was kidnapped and brainwashed in order to protect their reputation. Amy becomes depressive when forced to go along with the story, and Bobby tries to coerce Amy into getting back together with him. When Lucy tries to see Amy again, Amy is forced to reject her. In the meantime, Lucy comes to realize she is not happy with her life of crime. In an attempt to win Amy back, Lucy returns everything she has ever stolen, and publicly turns over a new leaf.

At the time of the D.E.B.S. year-end dance, Amy is to be made D.E.B. of the year and deliver a speech where she is to denounce Lucy. Janet talks with Dominique and Max, who start to realize how unhappy Amy actually is. Lucy infiltrates the academy during the dance. When Bobby discovers this, he plans to track her down and kill her. Lucy evades Bobby only to hear Amy's speech about her experience as Lucy's captive. When Amy and Lucy meet eyes, Amy retracts her entire speech, and runs off-stage to be with Lucy. Petrie, Bobby and the rest of the academy try to track them down, when Lucy and Amy are cornered by Max, Janet, and Dominique. At Amy's insistence, they give their blessings to Lucy and Amy, and allow them to make their escape. Lucy and Amy ride off into the night, heads on one another's shoulders.

Cast 

Ritchie was the only cast member from the short film to reprise her role in the expansion.

Production

Inception  
Director, writer, and editor Angela Robinson began to draw comics about the D.E.B.S. in college as a sideline to her writing. She received a $20,000 grant from Power Up to make an 11-minute short based on the concept, which toured a number of film festivals, including the Sundance Film Festival. Clint Culpepper, then president of Screen Gems, liked the short and gave the green light to develop it into a feature film.

Reception

Critical response 
D.E.B.S. received a 42% approval rating at Rotten Tomatoes based on 64 reviews. The site's critics consensus reads: "Lacking enough material for a full-length movie, D.E.B.S. is short on both plot and laughs." On Metacritic, it has a weighted average score of 42% based on reviews from 21 critics, indicating "mixed or average reviews".

In a positive review, Stephen Hunter of The Washington Post praised the film for poking fun at various tropes in spy films and not taking itself too seriously, saying “much of the fun of the innocent little thing is the riffs that [Angela] Robinson plays on familiar genre strokes. A gunfight in a nightclub, with sparks flying, guns blasting, glasses busting, shooters diving, has all the hallmarks of John Woo-style mayhem in full bloom.” He added the film “arrives with sparkly production values and extreme confidence in every scene. It's so spoofy it's difficult to call it ‘good’ or even ‘bad’; just say it's smooth.”

Hunter further discussed how the film presents queerness in a normalized way, saying the film is “not gay in that in-your-face, zealous manner of so many films more interested in advocacy than art or commerce. It's gay in what might be called a homo-normative way. That is, it accepts same-sex attraction as a norm, something not at all ‘unusual’ or strange but something so a part of the landscape it doesn't require comment.”

A positive reaction from a producer at a film festival screening led to Robinson making a deal to direct the 2005 Disney remake Herbie: Fully Loaded.

Peter Travers of Rolling Stone gave a one-star rating and said, “You might think there's no downside to a movie that peeks up the skirts of babes in micro-minis, but writer-director Angela Robinson's dimwitted satire is libido-killing proof to the contrary.”

The film has since gained a cult following in the LGBT community and continues to be screened at specialty theaters.

Box office 
D.E.B.S. was released in 45 theaters. Over 21 days, it grossed $97,446.

Accolades

References

External links 

 
 
 D.E.B.S. at Sony Pictures

2004 films
2004 action comedy films
2004 directorial debut films
2004 independent films
2004 LGBT-related films
2000s buddy comedy films
2000s crime comedy films
2000s English-language films
2000s female buddy films
2000s parody films
2000s spy comedy films
2000s teen comedy films
American action comedy films
American buddy comedy films
American crime comedy films
American female buddy films
American parody films
American spy comedy films
American teen comedy films
American teen LGBT-related films
Destination Films films
Features based on short films
Films about fraternities and sororities
Films directed by Angela Robinson
Films produced by Andrea Sperling
Films shot in Los Angeles
Girls with guns films
Lesbian-related films
LGBT-related buddy comedy films
Screen Gems films
Teen action films
Teen buddy films
Teen crime films
2000s American films